Ciaran Scally is a retired Irish rugby union scrum-half. He played for Blackrock College, UCD, Leinster and also won four caps for Ireland from 1998 to 1999. A knee injury ended his career in 1999 at the age of just 21.

References

Ireland international rugby union players
Irish rugby union players
Leinster Rugby players
University College Dublin R.F.C. players
Blackrock College RFC players
Living people
Year of birth missing (living people)
People educated at Blackrock College
Rugby union scrum-halves